Franklin Township, Ohio, may refer to:

Franklin Township, Adams County, Ohio
Franklin Township, Brown County, Ohio
Franklin Township, Clermont County, Ohio
Franklin Township, Columbiana County, Ohio
Franklin Township, Coshocton County, Ohio
Franklin Township, Darke County, Ohio
Franklin Township, Franklin County, Ohio
Franklin Township, Fulton County, Ohio
Franklin Township, Harrison County, Ohio
Franklin Township, Jackson County, Ohio
Franklin Township, Licking County, Ohio
Franklin Township, Mercer County, Ohio
Franklin Township, Monroe County, Ohio
Franklin Township, Morrow County, Ohio
Franklin Township, Portage County, Ohio
Franklin Township, Richland County, Ohio
Franklin Township, Ross County, Ohio
Franklin Township, Shelby County, Ohio
Franklin Township, Tuscarawas County, Ohio
Franklin Township, Warren County, Ohio
Franklin Township, Wayne County, Ohio

Ohio township disambiguation pages